Crossroads is an album by the American musician Jerry González, released in 1994. He is credited with his Fort Apache Band.

The album was nominated for a Grammy Award, in the "Best Latin Jazz Performance" category.

Production
Crossroads was produced by Todd Barkan. Steve Berrios played on the album, as did John Stubblefield.

"Lament" is a cover of the J.J. Johnson song; "Fort Apache" is a cover of the Jackie McLean song. "Thelingus" is a tribute to Thelonious Monk, Duke Ellington, and Charles Mingus.

Critical reception

The Edmonton Journal wrote that the band is "equally adept at diving into bop arrangements, ballads and Afro-Cuban rhythmic patterns with considerable zeal." The Times Colonist called the band "the world's premier Latin jazz group," and praised the "great writing, dynamic soloing ... thoughtful arranging, and fiery rhythmic grounding."

The Toronto Star deemed the album "Afro-Cubop at its best, a live-wire 12 tracks mixing rumba and riff, Western horns with fierce Latin rhythms over constant percussive cutting sessions." The News & Observer praised the "baked-in-coals rhythm section." The Wichita Eagle declared: "Perhaps today's best blend of Afro-Cuban music and jazz, this 15-year-old sextet is stunning as it roars through a varied program."

AllMusic wrote that the band "somewhat de-emphasizes the Latin side of its music in favor of swinging hard bop."

Track listing

References

1994 albums
Milestone Records albums